BBC Bitesize, also abbreviated to Bitesize, is the BBC's free online study support resource for school-age pupils in the United Kingdom. It is designed to aid pupils in both schoolwork and, for older pupils, exams.

National sections

England  

The Key Stage 1, 2 and 3 along with GCSE section covers a range of subjects. In Key Stage 1, 17 subjects are available, including Art and Design, Computing, Design and Technology, English, Geography, History, Maths, Music, Physical Education, PSHE, Citizenship, Religious Education, Science, and Modern Foreign Languages.  The Key Stage 2 site covers 23 subjects, Key Stage 3 section contains 33 subjects, and the GCSE section contains 49 subjects across several exam boards.

Scotland  
Until 2014, the Standard Grade section of the site had 12 subjects: Biology, History, Chemistry, Computing Studies, Maths, English, Modern Studies (a course exclusive to Scotland), French, Physical Education, Geography, and Physics. The site was updated in 2014 to replace the Standard Grade section with National 4 and National 5 sections. Gaelic versions of these were also made available.

Until 2014, in the Higher section, Biology, English, Geography, Maths, Chemistry, History, Modern Studies, Physics and the Scotland-only subject Scottish Gaelic were available. The Higher section was also updated to the new Curriculum for Excellence qualification. Early and 1st level, 2nd level, 3rd level, and 4th level resources were added to bring the site in line with the Curriculum for Excellence.

Wales  
The CS3 and TGAU sections are in Welsh. Links to the English language sections are included.

Northern Ireland  
In 2014, a Northern Ireland section was added to the site. It solely contains links to the English language KS1/KS2/KS3/GCSE sections.

See also
e-learning
Study skills for exam preparation

References

External links
Bitesize

BBC New Media
British educational websites
Educational broadcasting in the United Kingdom
Internet properties established in 1998